Cracroft is a south-west suburb of Christchurch, Canterbury, New Zealand.

Cracroft was named for John Cracroft Wilson, who settled in this part of Christchurch at the bottom of the Port Hills Range in 1854. The Cracroft Residents' Association started lobbying for Cracroft to become a suburb in 1993, and the New Zealand Geographic Board gazetted the suburb in 1999, splitting the area from Cashmere.

See also
Cracroft, British Columbia
Cracroft Islands, British Columbia

References

Suburbs of Christchurch